Moulvibazar is a town in north-eastern Bangladesh just south of Sylhet. It is the capital of Moulvibazar Sadar Upazila and Moulvibazar District, and is located on the banks of the Manu River. The town has a high population density.

History

In 1771, Moulvi Syed Qudratullah established a bazaar near the banks of the Manu River using his zamindari land. He started importing edible goods, such as fruits and vegetables opening up opportunities for people to purchase as well as sell. The location allowed easy access through river and land transport. The bazaar became the headquarters of South Sylhet subdivision in 1882. The anti-British Khilafat Movement in 1921 also spread to Moulvibazar and campaigners that were present included Chittaranjan Das, Hussain Ahmed Madani and Sarojini Naidu. In 1932, the Ali Amzad Government Girls' High School was opened as a public school.

During the Indo-Pakistani War of 1971 and Bangladesh Liberation War, the Pakistan Army moved its 313rd Brigade from Sylhet to Moulvibazar and a battalion from the 313rd was kept at Sylhet to form the nucleus of the 202nd ad hoc Brigade. On 20 December, a number of people were killed and wounded by mine explosions at the premises of the Moulvibazar Government High School.

On 22 February 1984, Moulvibazar became the headquarters of the newly established Moulvibazar Sadar Upazila, and the Moulvibazar District - which was renamed from South Sylhet. In 2005, the Saifur Rahman Stadium was established, acting as a multi-use arena fitting 15,000 people.

Administration
The pourashava is made up of 9 wards:
Ward 1: North Samoli, Banani, Shoiyarpur, Forest Office, Girzapara, Kashinath, Shamshernagar
Ward 2: Borobari, Bonosree, Raghunandanpur, East Court, Circuit House, Mission Area, Shonapur, West Borshijura
Ward 3: Arambag, Kalimabad, Noyagaon, Chubra, West Court
Ward 4: Madhyapara, Shantibag, Muslim Quarter
Ward 5: Berry Lake Char, Lakeview, Shahbag, Golbag, Paschim Bazar, 
Ward 6: Borohat, Kushumbag, Baroikona, Boliyarbag, Upazila Complex
Ward 7: Dargah Mahalla, Kazirgaon, New Hospital, East Gavindasri, Sultanpur
Ward 8: Darzir Mahal, Dhorkapon, Gavindasri, Sabuzbag
Ward 9: Borkapon, Daarok, Sheikher Gaon, Khindur, North Mostafapur

Climate
Moulvibazar has a humid subtropical climate. The Köppen-Geiger climate classification is Cwa. The climate of Moulvibazar is generally marked with monsoons, high temperature, considerable humidity and heavy rainfall. The hot season commences early in April and continues till July. About  of precipitation falls annually.

References

 
Populated places in Maulvibazar District